is a Japanese international rugby union player who plays as a Scrum-half.

References

1992 births
Living people
Japanese rugby union players
Japan international rugby union players
Rugby union scrum-halves
Tokyo Sungoliath players
Sunwolves players
21st-century Japanese people